At the time of the 1981 Census of India, the Malappuram district was divided into 4 Taluks namely, Eranad, Perinthalmanna, Tirur, and Ponnani. The Taluks were further classified into several Revenue Villages which were again a combination of some Desoms. This is a list of Desoms and their curresponding Revenue Villages of Malappuram district in the year 1981.
Desoms included in the Municipal towns of Malappuram District in 1981 are not included in this list. In 1981, Malappuram District had four Municipal Towns, Malappuram and Manjeri in Eranad Taluk, Tirur in Tirur Taluk, and Ponnani in Ponnani taluk.

Background
Desoms were the basic unit of Revenue Divisions in the Malabar District during British Raj. Desoms were usually named on the basis of smaller towns or forest area in that region. One or more Desoms combine to form Amsoms. Several Amsoms combine to form Revenue blocks. One or more Revenue blocks combine to form Taluks. These Taluks combine to form Revenue Divisions. It was the hierarchy of Revenue Administration in the erstwhile Malabar District. Following the formation of the state of Kerala in 1956, the Amsoms were replaced by Revenue Villages.

Eranad Taluk

Perinthalmanna Taluk

Tirur Taluk

Ponnani Taluk

See also
 List of villages in Malappuram district
 List of Gram Panchayats in Malappuram district

References 

Malappuram district
villages in Malappuram